Tournefortia rufo-sericea is a species of soldierbush plant in the family Boraginaceae. It is endemic to Ecuador.

References

rufo-sericea
Endemic flora of Ecuador
Vulnerable flora of South America
Taxonomy articles created by Polbot